Chelodina walloyarrina, the Kimberley long neck turtle or Kimberley snake-necked turtle, is a large species of long neck turtle endemic to the Kimberley region of Western Australia. In recent years, it has been unclear as to whether this was a valid species or not. It has been recognised as such by the 2017 version of the Turtle Checklist.

References

Chelodina
Turtles of Australia
Reptiles described in 2007